"Hunger of the Pine" is a song by English indie rock band alt-J. It was released as the lead single from the band's second studio album This Is All Yours on 19 June 2014.

Background and composition

"Hunger of the Pine" was one of several songs written by Alt-J following bassist Gwil Sainsbury's departure from the band in January 2014. It samples the words "I'm a female rebel" from American recording artist Miley Cyrus's 2013 song "4x4". Thom Green, the band's drummer, had produced a remix of "4x4" for Cyrus, and incorporated the vocal sample into the song; according to lead singer Joe Newman, Cyrus was "cool" with the band using the sample and "has been really supportive of us, and she's a fan, I think, which is really nice." Keyboardist Gus Unger-Hamilton stated that the sample "sounded cool with what Joe was playing on the guitar."

Unger-Hamilton further explained to NPR the meaning of the song: "The lyrics mainly suggest the idea that missing someone – pining – can be a physical pain much like hunger.

Release
On June 13, 2014, alt-J posted a video on their Instagram account featuring a clip of "Hunger of the Pine". On June 18, the single premiered on Zane Lowe's BBC Radio 1 show and was made available for streaming. It was released to the iTunes Store the following day.

Music video
The music video for "Hunger of the Pine" was released on YouTube on 16 July 2014, three days prior to the single's release. The video, directed by Nabil Elderkin, graphically depicts a man (played by professional freerunner Ashley "Spider" Holland) getting shot by arrows as he runs through a forest. At the end of the video, the man drenches himself with what appears to be gasoline from a jerrycan while approaching flaming arrows fill the sky.

Charts

Certifications

Release history

In popular culture
The song is featured in the pilot episode of the American drama series UnREAL. It is also featured in the first episode of Season 6 of The Vampire Diaries.

References

2014 singles
Alt-J songs
2014 songs
Experimental rock songs
Music videos directed by Nabil Elderkin
Songs written by Thom Sonny Green